The Fremont, Elkhorn & Missouri Valley Railroad Depot in Dwight, Nebraska was built in 1887 as a railroad depot of the Fremont, Elkhorn & Missouri Valley Railroad.  It was later a Chicago & Northwestern Railroad (C & N W) depot.  It was listed on the National Register of Historic Places in 1979.

It is a one-and-a-half-story  wood-frame structure, partitioned in a normal way for country railroad stations: the south end has a combination baggage-freight room, a business office including an agent's work area and a passenger waiting area is in the middle, and the north end was living quarters for the depot agent.

It has not been used as a train station since 1962, when the C & N W branchline from Platte River Junction, Nebraska,
to Seward, Nebraska, was dismantled in 1962.

References

External links

Railway stations on the National Register of Historic Places in Nebraska
National Register of Historic Places in Butler County, Nebraska
Railway stations in the United States opened in 1887
Former railway stations in Nebraska
Dwight
Railway stations closed in 1962